Julian Peter McDonald Clary (born 25 May 1959) is an English actor, comedian, novelist and presenter. He began  appearing on television in the mid-1980s. Since then he has also acted in films, television and stage productions, numerous pantomimes and was the winner of Celebrity Big Brother 10 in 2012.

Early life and education
Clary was born on 25 May 1959 in Surbiton, Surrey, to Brenda  ( McDonald) Clary, a probation officer, and Peter J. Clary, a police officer. He was brought up in Teddington, Middlesex, with two older sisters. By his own account, he was conceived "in broad daylight" in Clacton-on-Sea in 1958. Two of his great-grandparents were Germans who had emigrated to Britain at the end of the nineteenth century. He and his siblings were raised as Roman Catholics. He attended St Benedict's School, Ealing and, later, he studied English and Drama at Goldsmiths' College, University of London.

Stand-up comedy
Clary is a gay comedian who refers to himself as a "renowned homosexual" and is known for his outrageous and flamboyant costumes and make-up, and interactions with his audience such as looking in their bags, comments on their attire and flirting with straight men in the audience. For those who get too close he is quick to respond "Don't touch me". He has been assisted by Hugh Jelly and others in audience participation segments.

Clary began his career under the name Leo Hurll, a fake keyboardist for pop band Thinkman (a recording project conceived by Rupert Hine). He entered the alternative comedy scene in the early 1980s, first under the alias Gillian Pieface and later as The Joan Collins Fan Club. He wore heavy glam make-up and dressed in outrageous clothes, often involving leather/PVC and hinting at bondage. His pet dog Fanny the Wonderdog, a whippet mongrel, also featured in performances.

Since then, Clary has undertaken several successful tours of his stage act, some of which have been released on home video, including:
 The Mincing Machine Tour (1989) 
 My Glittering Passage (1993)
 Natural Born Mincer (2003)
 Lord of the Mince (2009–10)  
 Position Vacant: Apply Within (2012–13) In April 2014 he took the show to Australia and New Zealand.
 The Joy of Mincing (2016) 
 Born To Mince (2019)

He was named Ambassador for the 2016 Adelaide Fringe, responsible for promoting the festival internationally.

Television
After a number of appearances on Friday Night Live in the mid- to late 1980s, Clary co-hosted the short-lived ITV game show Trick or Treat in 1989 with Mike Smith, before achieving greater success later that year with his own high-camp Channel 4 game show, Sticky Moments with Julian Clary. More a vehicle for his brand of humour than a genuine gameshow, Sticky Moments was a light-hearted "non-quiz" satire, with him often awarding points because he liked the contestants, rather than because they possessed a particular skill or aptitude. He later starred in the 1992 audience participation sitcom Terry and Julian with Lee Simpson, again for Channel 4.

Also in 1992, he played a cameo guest star part in the BBC drama Virtual Murder. In the episode "A Dream of Dracula", he played an undertaker, alongside other guest stars including Alfred Marks, Jill Gascoine, Ronald Fraser and Peggy Mount. In the same year, while visiting Australia, he made a controversial appearance alongside Rex Mossop on Tonight Live with Steve Vizard, during which Mossop espoused homophobic opinions. He also appeared in an episode of the improvisational comedy show Whose Line Is It Anyway? in 1991.

On 12 December 1993, he made an infamous appearance at the British Comedy Awards, where he made a joke comparing the set to Hampstead Heath (some of which is known as a cruising area for gay men) and stated he had just been fisting the former Chancellor of the Exchequer Norman Lamont, who had presented an award earlier in the ceremony. Due to the instant audience reaction, the punchline ("Talk about a red box!") was widely overlooked. Although the joke was met with uproarious laughter from the audience and Lamont himself did not complain over it, he was criticised in some newspapers, particularly by the Daily Mail and The Sun, who both launched a campaign to have him banned from television. Despite these attempts, Clary's next series was the BBC's studio-based All Rise for Julian Clary in 1996, in which he played a judge in a mock courtroom setting.
 
From 1998 to 2001, he hosted three series of the Sky TV show Prickly Heat, the first two series with Davina McCall, the last one with Denise van Outen. Additionally, from 1999 to 2002 he was the face of Daz laundry detergent, taking over from Shane Richie, Michael Barrymore and Danny Baker. He is a recurring performer and one of the most popular performers in the ITV Pantos. He played "First Henchman" and "Tim" in 1998's Jack and The Beanstalk; "The Good Fairy" in 2000's Cinderella; "The Genie of the Lamp" in 2000's Aladdin; and, possibly his favourite character, "Chris the Cat" in 2002's Dick Whittington. In 1999, he became a team captain on the quiz show It's Only TV...but I Like It, alongside Phill Jupitus and Jonathan Ross. In 2003, he presented the first series of the Japanese TV clip show, Sushi TV for Challenge. In 2004, he took part in the BBC series Strictly Come Dancing, finishing third with his partner Erin Boag. In 2005, he hosted Come and Have A Go for the National Lottery.

He was the subject of This Is Your Life in 2001 when he was surprised by Michael Aspel during the curtain call of the pantomime Cinderella at the Richmond Theatre.

On 1 February 2006, he appeared on the BBC programme Who Do You Think You Are?, a genealogy series which traced his ancestors to a World War I flight engineer and German immigrants among both his mother's and father's forebears. In May 2006, and again in April 2008, he hosted an episode of the topical quiz show Have I Got News for You.

In September 2006, he returned to primetime TV as presenter and judge on Channel 5's brand new celebrity performance programme The All Star Talent Show. He was joined by two guest judges every week to assess celebrity performances and co-presented with Myleene Klass and Andi Peters. He also narrated the Channel 5 children's series The Little Princess with Jane Horrocks.

In November 2006, he appeared on QI, a panel game/comedy show hosted by Stephen Fry and also appeared on an episode of The New Paul O'Grady Show.

In 2007, he made a cameo appearance in the Australian soap opera, Neighbours, in scenes filmed in London with Natalie Bassingthwaighte.

From 20 March 2007, Clary presented a brand-new show for the BBC called The Underdog Show. Celebrities and children were paired up with rescue dogs. They then commenced training and competed against each other in obedience and agility trials in a live arena. The show ran until 26 April 2007.

He also appeared on television regularly in 2008, starting in January when he was drafted in as a relief presenter for This Morning, co-presenting alongside Fern Britton and Ruth Langsford during Phillip Schofield's absence. In April, he once again fronted the BBC One series Have I Got News for You, and he filmed an episode of Celebrity Bargain Hunt in May. He was also a short-notice guest on The Paul O'Grady Show in October 2008, after Peter Andre and Katie Price could not appear (Clary and O'Grady are friends and neighbours).

In 2012, Clary was one of the contestants in Celebrity Big Brother 10 and went on to win the series. In 2013, he was a judge on the ITV entertainment series Your Face Sounds Familiar, alongside Emma Bunton.

In March 2015, it was announced that Clary would take part in ITV's Give a Pet a Home show which works alongside the RSPCA in Birmingham. The series began airing on 15 April 2015 for six episodes.

From 1 August 2015, Clary presented Nature Nuts with Julian Clary, a new three-part nature show for ITV.

Theatre and pantomime
Clary played Leigh Bowery in the West End of London musical Taboo in 2002. He also took part in the touring production in 2004.

In Spring 2007, Clary did a theatre tour of the UK with his show An Evening with... Julian Clary. From 2 October 2007, he played the much coveted role of 'Emcee', in Rufus Norris's Olivier Award-winning production of Cabaret, which was in its second year in the West End. Clary was with the show until 19 April 2008. The following year he took part in the Strictly Come Dancing Tour in January and February 2009. He was partnered with Lilia Kopylova.

Clary starred as Michael in Le Grand Mort, a play written specifically for him by playwright Stephen Clark (prior to his death in 2016), opposite James Nelson-Joyce as Tim from 20 September to 28 October 2017 at Trafalgar Studios 2 in London's West End.

Clary was due to appear as Norman in a UK tour of The Dresser by Ronald Harwood, alongside Matthew Kelly as 'Sir' in September 2020, however due to the ongoing COVID-19 pandemic, the production has been postponed to 2021.

Clary has appeared in numerous Christmas pantomimes and has recently become a regular star of the London Palladium pantomimes. In December 2019, Clary was inducted in a ceremony held by Andrew Lloyd Webber onto the Wall of Fame, joining the many stars that have appeared at the Palladium.

Film
Clary appeared in the film Carry On Columbus (1992), an unsuccessful attempt to revive the "Carry On" series of films. It was widely panned by critics, but was more financially profitable than the two other Columbus films released the same year: 1492: Conquest of Paradise and Christopher Columbus: The Discovery.

Clary returned to film in 2001 in the film The Baby Juice Express  which starred Lisa Faulkner, Samantha Womack, Ruth Jones and David Seaman, about a prisoner who is desperate to find some way of conceiving with his wife whilst he is in prison, but the sperm ends up getting hijacked. It was released on DVD in 2004.

Radio
Clary appeared on The Big Fun Show in 1988.

In 1992 Clary hosted a radio show for the BBC called Intimate Contact, the premise of which was for him to act as a genial 'Mr Fix-it' for a wide range of 'punter' problems. Clary attempted to solve these issues over the telephone, with the assistance of roving reporter "Hugh Jelly" (actor Philip Herbert). It originally aired on BBC Radio 1 for two series; the pilot and 6-part first series have since been repeated on BBC Radio 4 Extra a number of times.

He has also often been a guest on Just a Minute, the BBC Radio 4 comedy show.

Writing
Clary has released two large format comedy books: My Life With Fanny The Wonder Dog (1989) and How To Be A Man (1992). Between 2005 and 2008, Clary wrote a fortnightly column for the New Statesman magazine.

Autobiographies
He published an autobiography, A Young Man's Passage, which covers his life and career up to the 1993 "Norman Lamont incident" at the British Comedy Awards (see above). Then in 2021 The Lick of Love: How Dogs Changed My Life, telling his life through his pets to more recent times.

Novels
In 2007, Clary released his first novel, Murder Most Fab, published by Ebury Press. His second novel, Devil in Disguise, was published in 2009.

Children's books ("The Bolds")
Since 2015 he has written a number of books for children:

Music
Clary often performs comical renditions of musical numbers in his stage and television appearances, ranging from old classics to original material. He released a music single in 1988 (credited as the Joan Collins Fan Club), a humorous rendition of "Leader of the Pack", which he often performed in his stage and television appearances at the time. The single was produced by Rupert Hine and reached number 60 in the UK Singles Chart. Another single, "Wand'rin' Star", was released in 1990. The single was backed with the self-penned track, "Uncanny and Unnatural".

Personal life
Clary’s boyfriend Christopher died of AIDS in 1991. Clary has been in a relationship with Ian Mackley since 2005, and the couple were married on 19 November 2016.  They lived at Goldenhurst Farm, a seventeenth-century manor house once owned by Noël Coward, in Aldington, Kent until 2018. Clary also has a house in Camden, North London.

On 7 September 2005, the University of London's Goldsmiths College made Clary an Honorary Fellow. In July 2014, the University of East Anglia awarded Clary an honorary Doctorate of Civil Law.

Stand-up VHS and DVD

References

External links
Official Julian Clary website

Julian Clary on Who Do You Think You Are?

Marcus Lush interview with Julian Clary (NZ)
What's On Wales interview with Julian Clary

1959 births
Living people
20th-century English comedians
20th-century English male writers
20th-century English novelists
20th-century English LGBT people
21st-century English comedians
21st-century English male writers
21st-century English novelists
21st-century English LGBT people
Alumni of Goldsmiths, University of London
English male comedians
English male novelists
English people of German descent
English people of Irish descent
English stand-up comedians
English television presenters
English gay actors
English gay writers
Gay comedians
English LGBT actors
English LGBT novelists
People educated at St Benedict's School, Ealing
People from Surbiton
People from Teddington
Reality show winners
British LGBT comedians